"I Don't Want Control of You" is a song recorded by Scottish rock band Teenage Fanclub. The song was released on 18 August 1997 through Creation Records, as the second single from the band's sixth studio album Songs from Northern Britain. The song was written and sung by vocalist and guitarist Norman Blake.

The song peaked at number 43 on the UK Singles Chart.

Background
Norman Blake, in a 2016 interview, considered it among his personal favorite songs by the band:

Reception
Matt Collar, in a review of Songs from Northern Britain on AllMusic, considered the song "one of the most beautiful affirmations of fidelity in a relationship." Pitchfork contributor Sam Sodomsky called it a "brilliantly unguarded" love song, while James Cosby at PopMatters praised the tune's "bold, sometimes rather astonishing lyrical observations."

Charts

References

1997 singles
1997 songs
Creation Records singles
Jangle pop songs